Krzysztof Buras is a Polish bridge player.

Bridge accomplishments

Wins

 Cavendish Invitational Pairs (1) 2014
 North American Bridge Championships (1)
 Roth Open Swiss Teams (1) 2009

Runners-up

 World Transnational Open Teams Championship (1) 2009 
 World Olympiad Teams Championship (1) 2012
 North American Bridge Championships (3)
 Jacoby Open Swiss Teams (1) 2008 
 Keohane North American Swiss Teams (1) 2012 
 Reisinger (1) 2013

References

External links
 
 

Polish contract bridge players
Living people
Place of birth missing (living people)
Year of birth missing (living people)